Sheikh Abdul Aziz (1952 – 11 August 2008) was chairman of the Jammu Kashmir Peoples League and a prominent member of the All Parties Hurriyat Conference, an alliance of Kashmiri separatist groups at the forefront of the political struggle against democratic Indian government in Jammu and Kashmir. He was a strong advocate of the right to self-determination of Kashmiri people and believed that an independent plebiscite under UN supervision could bring long lasting peace in South-Asia.

Aziz was killed by Indian Paramilitary Forces on 11 August 2008 while leading a demonstration against the alleged 'economic blockade' of the Kashmir Valley predominantly having Muslim population being enforced by native Kashmiri  hardliner groups during the Amarnath land transfer row .

Aziz was a former militant commander turned "pro-freedom" politician. He had been jailed on several occasions for demanding independence from both Kashmir. He is the third prominent separatist leader to have been killed after the eruption of 1989 armed struggle against Indian government in Jammu and Kashmir

Early life
Sheikh Abdul Aziz was born in 1952 in Namblabal, district Pampore close to the capital city Srinagar. He was of Arab ancestry whose ancestors had migrated from outside to Kashmir. He received basic education from Government School Pampore and then passed Matriculation from Government High School Pampore. Soon after passing his Matriculation examination, Aziz joined the agriculture business of his father Sheikh Abdul Salam, including growing high yield saffron, for which his hometown is famous throughout the Kashmir valley.

Death
On 11 August 2008 the "Muzaffarabad chalo" call was given by the Hurriyat Conference and some other organisations against the 'economical blockade' of Kashmir valley. Processions were taken out from various areas across the valley. Aziz and Shabbir Shah were leading the march from Sopore towards the de facto border with Pakistan, when their rally was stopped by a force of police and army at Chala, 25 km away from the border town of Uri, to disperse the march. Aziz along with many others were injured. All the critically injured were taken to Srinagar's SMHS hospital, where Aziz died. He was buried in "Marty's Graveyard" in Eidgah, Srinagar on 12 August 2008.

See also
 Ayub Thakur
 Hurriyat and Problems before Plebiscite
 2014 Jammu and Kashmir Legislative Assembly election
 Kashmir Dispute
 Syed Ali Shah Geelani
 United Nations Security Council Resolution 47

References and notes

External links
 Kashmir
 Kashmir Watch - In-depth Coverage on Kashmir Conflict
 Kashmiri - Canadian Council
 Kashmir Centre.EU
 Kashmir Affairs

1952 births
2008 deaths
Kashmir separatist movement
Jammu and Kashmir politicians
Kashmiri people
People from Pulwama district